Bernado Lassaletta Perrín (20 August 1882 - 12 March 1948) was a Spanish industrial engineer, professor and footballer who played as a forward for FC Barcelona between 1901 and 1903.

Biography
He was an industrial engineer, professor of general metallurgy and electrical technology at the School of Industrial Engineers in Barcelona and professor of mathematics at the School of Directors of Electrical Industries. In 1910 he become the head of the testing laboratory of the company Siemens Schuckert Indústria Elèctrica SA in Catalonia. In 1921, Lassaletta joined the Barcelona  as a full academician, and there he presented numerous papers and works.

As a young man, he played football with FC Barcelona between 1902 and 1904. Together with the likes of Joan Gamper, Luis de Ossó, Udo Steinberg, and Carles Comamala, he helped Barça win the Copa Barcelona, netting a total of 5 goals in the tournament that was later recognized as the fourth edition of the Catalan Championship.

In 1923 he was part of the entourage that welcomed Albert Einstein on his visit to Catalonia, invited by the Commonwealth of Catalonia, whom he accompanied during his visit to the Poblet Abbey, together with his wife Elsa and Ventura Gassol and Rafael Campalans. On 6 March 1923, Einstein was nominated as a corresponding member of the physical sciences section of the Academy by Lassaleta, the mathematician Ferran Tallada, and the physicists Ramon Jardí and Tomas Escriche i Mieg, in a ceremony at the Barcelona's Academy of Sciences and Arts.

Honours
FC Barcelona
 Copa Barcelona
 Champions: 1902–03

References

1882 births
1948 deaths
Spanish footballers
FC Barcelona players
Association football forwards
People from Barcelona